Spreading Rumours is the second studio album by the indie rock band Grouplove. It was released on September 17, 2013. The lead single "Ways to Go" peaked at #2 on the US Alternative Airplay chart. Their single  "I'm With You" featured as soundtrack in EA Sports game, FIFA 14.

Critical reception

Critics generally thought that the album's individual songs were usually fun, but the album as a whole was criticized for being too long and not flowing well. On Metacritic, the received an average critic review score of 56 out of 100, based on reviews from 11 critics indicating "mixed or average reviews".

Chart performance
The album debuted at No. 21 on the Billboard 200. and No. 7 on Top Rock Albums for charts dated October 5, 2013, selling 16,000 copies in the first week. The album has sold 80,000 copies in the US as of August 2016.

Track listing

Personnel
 Christian Zucconi – lead vocals, guitar, piano
 Hannah Hooper – lead vocals, percussion, keyboards
 Andrew Wessen – lead guitar, backing vocals
 Sean Gadd – bass guitar, vocals on "Flowers"
 Ryan Rabin – drums, producer

Chart positions

References 

Grouplove albums
2013 albums